This is a list of notable Chinese soups. Chinese cuisine includes styles originating from the diverse regions of China, as well as from Chinese people in other parts of the world. Many Chinese soups are noodle-based. By 2000 BCE, wheat had arrived in China from western Asia. These grains were typically served as warm noodle soups instead of baked into bread as in Europe. Chinese noodles are used in the preparation of some Chinese soups.

Chinese soups

 Bak kut teh
 Banmian
 Beef noodle soup
 Black sesame soup 
 Boiled mutton soup
 Buddha Jumps Over the Wall 
 Cantonese seafood soup 
 Carp soup
 Chicken and duck blood soup 
 Chicken soup – Many Chinese soups are based on chicken broth. Typical Chinese chicken soup is made from old hens and is seasoned with ginger, scallions, black pepper, soy sauce, rice wine and sesame oil.
Chinese herbal soups  – homemade remedies with herbs or adaptogens (a well-known example is ginseng) to help heal specific health concerns.
 Corn crab soup 
 Crossing the bridge noodles
 Duck blood and vermicelli soup 

 Edible bird's nest 
 Egg drop soup
 Egg tong sui
 Fish and mustard leaf soup 
 Fish head soup 
 Geng
Ginseng chicken soup
 Hot and sour soup 
 Hulatang

 Hup Tul Woo – a sweet walnut soup
 Jiuniang
 Lettuce soup 
 Liver soup 
 Lotus seed and pork tripe soup 
 Lung fung soup
 Mung bean soup
 Noodle soup

 Nam ngiao
 Nangchang Jar soup
 Oxtail soup 
 Patriotic soup – developed during the Mongol conquest of the Song dynasty and named by Emperor Bing of Song. It is part of Teochew cuisine and is simple to prepare. Its main ingredients are leaf vegetable, broth, and edible mushrooms.
 Pig's organ soup 
 Pigeon soup
 Pork blood soup
 Red bean soup 

 Sago soup 
 Shark fin soup
 Silkie soup – Also known as Black chicken soup 
 Stewed chicken soup
 Sweet potato soup 
 Tian mo
 Tomato and egg soup 
 Tong sui
 Turtle soup – In countries such as Singapore with large Chinese populations, turtle soup is a Chinese delicacy.
 Wenzhou pig intestine rice noodle soup
 Winter melon spare rib soup 
 Wonton noodle
 Xidoufen
 Yong Tau Foo

Gallery

See also

 Asian soup
 Chinese spoon
 List of Chinese desserts
 List of Chinese dishes
 List of Chinese sauces
 List of soups

References

External links 
 

China
Soups